Nelson was launched at Bristol in 1807 as a West Indiaman. In January 1813 a United States privateer captured her off Jamaica.

Career
At the time of her launch, she was the largest vessel ever built at Bristol. Nelson first appeared in Lloyd's Register in the volume for 1807.

Captain William Thomas acquired a letter of marque on 31 October 1809.

Fate
On 8 February 1813,  was in an action with an American privateer that escaped. In the action the British lost three men killed and seven or eight wounded. This single-ship action may have been with the American privateer Saratoga. Algerine returned to port in Jamaica, while Saratoga went on to capture Nelson.

Nelson encountered Saratoga on 31 January 1813, having sailed from Carlisle Bay five days earlier. Nelson and Saratoga fought for about four hours before Nelson struck when about 20 leagues to windward of Jamaica. Saratoga mounted 16 guns and had a crew of 130 men. 

On 6 February Captain W.C. Wooster of Saratoga put the crew and passengers on a boat by which the 17 people reached Grand .

Reportedly, Nelson was in sight of Jamaica for three days before Saratoga sent Nelson into New Orleans.

Nelsons entry in Lloyd's Register for 1814 carried the annotation "captured".

Notes

Citations

References
 
 
 

1807 ships
Ships built in Bristol
Age of Sail merchant ships of England
Captured ships